This article is a list of diseases of pineapples (Ananas comosus).

Bacterial diseases

Bacterial diseases (fruit)

Fungal diseases

Fungal diseases (fruit)

Nematodes, parasitic

Virus and viruslike diseases

Miscellaneous diseases or disorders (fruit)

See also
List of foliage plant diseases (Bromeliaceae)

References
Common Names of Diseases, The American Phytopathological Society

Pineapple
Disease
Pineapple